Blink of an Eye is an album by American jazz saxophonist Rob Brown which was recorded live in 1996 and released on No More, the label founded by producer Alan Schneider. The album features a duo performance with pianist Matthew Shipp nearly a decade after they played together on their debut recording, Sonic Explorations. They reunited in June 1996 as part of the Vision Festival and Brown asked Shipp to share his evening at Roulette. This is the first documented recording of Rob playing flute.

Reception

In his review for AllMusic, Thom Jurek states "Everything is full-speed ahead, though there are dynamic breaks and continuances and the unfolding of dramatic tonal architectures that are layered in such textured balance that they create a towering, yet gentle perceived aural structure."

The Penguin Guide to Jazz says that "Shipp and Brown specifically avoid the obvious Taylor-Lyons comparisons, but they have insufficient material at their fingertips to justify a format which calls for the highest leves of improvisational finesse."

Track listing
All compositions by Rob Brown and Matthew Shipp
 "Blink of an Eye part 1" – 28:44
 "Blink of an Eye part 2" – 32:27
 "Blink of an Eye part 3" – 8:44

Personnel
Rob Brown – alto sax, flute
Matthew Shipp – piano

References

1997 live albums
Rob Brown (saxophonist) live albums
Matthew Shipp live albums